Carl Albrecht Oberg (27 January 1897 – 3 June 1965) was a German SS functionary during the Nazi era. He served as Senior SS and Police Leader (HSSPF) in occupied France, from May 1942 to November 1944, during the Second World War, Oberg came to be known as the Butcher of Paris.  From May 1942, under orders from Reinhard Heydrich, Oberg ordered the execution of hundreds of hostages and the roundup and deportation of over 40,000 Jews from France to extermination camps, most infamously during the Vel' d'Hiv Roundup with the assistance of the Vichy French police.

Arrested by American military police in Tyrol in July 1945, Oberg was sentenced to death by two different courts: British and French before being handed over to the French. In 1958 his death sentence was commuted to life imprisonment and later reduced to 20 years hard labour. Oberg was eventually released on 28 November 1962 and pardoned by President Charles de Gaulle. He died in West Germany on 3 June 1965.

Early life
Carl Albrecht Oberg was born in Hamburg on 27 January 1897, the son of a physician and professor of medicine. In August 1914, he enlisted in the army and was assigned to the artillery, serving as battery officer. In November 1915, he was commissioned as a Leutnant fighting on the Western Front and was awarded the Iron Cross in both classes. He worked in manufacturing as a branch manager after the war until he was laid off in 1930.

Nazi career 

He joined the Nazi Party on 1 April 1931 and the SS on 7 April 1932. After meeting Reinhard Heydrich in May 1933, he asked Heydrich for a job and joined the Sicherheitsdienst (SD). Oberg was later promoted to an SS-Oberführer and made the police administrator for Hanover. He served in that capacity from September 1938 until January 1939. Oberg then served as Police President of Zwickau until late 1941. He served as SS-und Polizeiführer (SS and Police Leader - SSPF), "Radom" from August 1941 to May 1942. Oberg was promoted to SS-Brigadeführer on 20 April 1942.

From 5 May 1942 to 28 November 1944, Oberg served as Higher SS and Police Leader (HSSPF) "Frankreich" (France) over all German police forces in France, including the SD and the Gestapo. He was the supreme authority in France for managing anti-Jewish policy and the battle against the French Resistance. In 1942, shortly after his arrival, he issued the Jewish badge decree for identification, supported the roundup of 13,152 Jews in the Paris Vélodrome d'Hiver (Vel' d'Hiv Roundup), and ordered mass execution of hostages in retribution for acts of the French resistance. By that time he had been condemned as the "Butcher of Paris". On Heydrich's orders, Oberg deported over 40,000 Jews from the country with the assistance of the Vichy France police force headed by René Bousquet.

On 18 January 1943, Himmler demanded a cleansing of Marseilles with 100,000 arrests and explosive demolition of the city's crime district. Working with the French police, Oberg supervised a lesser response of 6,000 arrests, 20,000 people displaced, and partial destruction of the harbour area. In 1944, Oberg blocked an attempt to establish an Einsatzkommando of the Waffen-SS in France. On 10 March 1945, he became a General der Waffen-SS.

Post-war trial, sentence, and reprieve 
Oberg was captured in June 1945 in the mountains near Kitzbuhel by the U.S. military. He had been disguised as a private in the Austrian Army. He was sentenced to death by a British court before receiving another death sentence from the French in October 1954. On 10 April 1958, the sentence was commuted to life by French President Vincent Auriol, his successor René Coty then reduced it further to 20 years hard labor in 1959. On 20 November 1962, Oberg was finally pardoned by President Charles de Gaulle and set free on 28 November 1962.
Oberg then was repatriated to Flensburg, in the north of the German state of Schleswig-Holstein, at the time, according to Die Zeit, a stronghold of former Nazis and SS cadres.

Notes

References

Sources
  Birn, Ruth Bettina, Die höheren SS- und Polizeiführer. Himmlers Vertreter im Reich und in den besetzten Gebieten Düsseldorf 1986 (Seite 252ff, 341)
  Lappenküper, Ulrich Der "Schlächter von Paris". Carl-Albrecht Oberg als Höherer SS- und Polizeiführer in Frankreich (1942-1944) in: Deutschland und Frankreich im Krieg (Nov. 1942 - Herbst 1944). Okkupation, Kollaboration, Résistance Hg. S. Martens, M. Vaisse, Bonn: Bouvier, 2000 (Seite 129-143)
  Die faschistische Okkupationspolitik in Frankreich (1940-1944) Dokumentenauswahl. Hg. und Einl. Ludwig Nestler. Berlin: Deutscher Verlag der Wissenschaften, 1990 (Orts-, Personenregister)  (zahlreiche Einträge im Index)

External links
 Wiesenthal Center

SS and Police Leaders
1897 births
1965 deaths
Holocaust perpetrators in France
Prisoners sentenced to death by the British military
German prisoners of war in World War II held by the United States
Prisoners sentenced to death by France
Recipients of French presidential pardons
Military personnel from Hamburg
German people imprisoned abroad
German prisoners sentenced to death
SS-Obergruppenführer
Kapp Putsch participants
20th-century Freikorps personnel
Nazis convicted of war crimes
People convicted of crimes against humanity